Highway 51 is a highway in the Canadian province of Saskatchewan. It passes through the town of Kerrobert, where it shares a  concurrency with Highway 21 and Highway 31.

History 
When Highway 14 was realigned between Biggar and Landis, a portion of the bypassed section was renumbered and became part of Highway 51.

In 1999 the thin membrane surface section of Highway 51 east of Kerrobert was tested with a Cold in-place recycling or “CIR” method to rehabilitate highways.  This CIR process is a cost-effective method which recycles the top surface of a road.  This pulverized material is mixed with asphalt emulsion and spread and compacted back onto the highway surface.  This surface is then recovered with a new seal dependent on traffic volume.

Major intersections 
From west to east:

Footnotes

References

051